The I.O.O.F. – Paris Fair Building in Hood River, Oregon was built in 1906, with Early Commercial architecture.  Also known as Idlewild Lodge No. 107, Odd Fellow's Hall, and Paris Fair Department Store, it served historically as a department store and as an International Order of Odd Fellows meeting hall.  It was listed on the National Register of Historic Places in 1990.

Its third floor was originally the lodge hall.

References

1906 establishments in Oregon
Commercial buildings completed in 1906
Buildings and structures in Hood River, Oregon
Buildings designated early commercial in the National Register of Historic Places
Clubhouses on the National Register of Historic Places in Oregon
National Register of Historic Places in Hood River County, Oregon
Odd Fellows buildings in Oregon